Tongzhou or Tong Prefecture (Chinese: t , s , p Tòngzhōu) was a prefecture of imperial China seated in modern Dali County, Shaanxi. It existed intermittently from AD 554 to 1913.

Between 1735 and 1913 during the Qing dynasty it was known as Tongzhou Prefecture (t , s , p Tòngzhōufǔ).

Geography
The administrative region of Tongzhou in the Tang dynasty is under the administration of modern Weinan in eastern Shaanxi: 
 Dali County
 Hancheng City
 Heyang County
 Chengcheng County
 Baishui County

References
 

Prefectures of the Sui dynasty
Prefectures of the Tang dynasty
Prefectures of the Song dynasty
Prefectures of Qi (Five Dynasties)
Prefectures of Later Tang
Prefectures of Later Jin (Five Dynasties)
Prefectures of Later Han (Five Dynasties)
Prefectures of Later Zhou
Prefectures of the Jin dynasty (1115–1234)
Prefectures of the Yuan dynasty
Prefectures of the Ming dynasty
Prefectures of the Qing dynasty
Former prefectures in Shaanxi